The year 605 BC was a year of the pre-Julian Roman calendar. In the Roman Empire, it was known as year 149 Ab urbe condita. The denomination 605 BC for this year has been used since the early medieval period, when the Anno Domini calendar era became the prevalent method in Europe for naming years.

Events
Battle of Carchemish: Crown Prince Nebuchadnezzar defeats the allied armies of Egypt and former Assyria, securing the Babylonian conquest of Assyria (approximate date).
Battle of Hamath: Nebuchadnezzar II defeats the remainder of the Egyptian army after the Battle of Carchemish.
Nebuchadnezzar II succeeds his father Nabopolassar as king of Babylonia.

Births

Deaths
Nabopolassar, founder of the Neo-Babylonian Empire

References